The Philadelphia Phillies are a Major League Baseball franchise based in Philadelphia. They play in the National League East division. Also known in early franchise history as the "Philadelphia Quakers", the Phillies have used 72 different Opening Day starting pitchers in their 128 seasons. The first game of the new baseball season for a team is played on Opening Day, and being named the Opening Day starter is an honor, which is often given to the player who is expected to lead the pitching staff that season, though there are various strategic reasons why a team's best pitcher might not start on Opening Day. Where decisions are known, the 72 starters have a combined Opening Day record of 33 wins, 40 losses and 20 no decisions (33–40–20); where decisions are unknown, the team's record was 17–19. No decisions are awarded to the starting pitcher if the game is won or lost after the starting pitcher has left the game. It can also result if a starting pitcher does not pitch five full innings, even if his team retains the lead and wins.

Hall of Fame left-handed pitcher Steve Carlton has the most Opening Day starts for the Phillies, with 14, compiling a record of 3–9–2. He is followed by Robin Roberts (twelve starts; 5–6–1), Chris Short (six starts; 3–1–2), and Curt Schilling (five starts; 2–0–3). Grover Cleveland Alexander also made five Opening Day starts for the Phillies, equal to Schilling; however, no information on his decisions in those games is available. The team's record in his five Opening Day starts is 4–1.

Roberts holds the Phillies' record for most wins in Opening Day starts with five. Art Mahaffey has the best record in Opening Day starts for the franchise; though many players have won their only Opening Day start, Mahaffey started and won two Opening Day games, for a winning percentage of 1.000; Roy Halladay also has a 1.000 winning percentage, with two wins and a no decision in three starts. Conversely, George McQuillan is the only player to have a .000 winning percentage in more than one Opening Day start (0–2–0 in two starts). Brett Myers has a .000 winning percentage in his three starts, but has accumulated two no decisions (0–1–2). Carlton has the most Opening Day losses for the team, with nine.

The Phillies have played in six home ballparks. Their best overall Opening Day record is at Shibe Park (also known as Connie Mack Stadium), where they won 11 Opening Day games out of 14 played there (11–3). The team also owned an 8–17 Opening Day record at Baker Bowl (initially known as the Philadelphia Baseball Grounds), with 1 tie. Recreation Park's Opening Day record is 1–2, while Veterans Stadium has the lowest winning percentage (.200), with 2 wins and 8 losses. The Phillies currently play at Citizens Bank Park, where they are 1–5 on Opening Day.

The Phillies have played in seven World Series championships in their history, winning in 1980 and 2008. Carlton won his Opening Day start against the Montreal Expos in 1980, while Myers received a no-decision against the same franchise (now the Washington Nationals) in 2008, a game that the Phillies eventually lost, and lost the opening game against the Atlanta Braves in 2009. Carlton also started Opening Day in 1983, the year that the Phillies lost to the Baltimore Orioles in the World Series. Alexander started Opening Day in 1915, the Phillies' first World Series appearance, while Roberts started the first game of 1950, and Terry Mulholland the first game of 1993.

Key

Starting pitchers

Footnotes
In 1907, the Giants forfeited the opening day game to the Phillies, who won 3–0.
In 1923, the opening day game ended in a tie with the Brooklyn Robins, 5–5. The teams played again the following day, with the Robins defeating the Phillies, 6–5.
In 1924, the opening day game ended in a tie with the Boston Braves, 6–6. The teams played again the following day, with the Braves defeating the Phillies, 4–3, in 10 innings.
In 1937, the Phillies played the Boston Braves in a doubleheader on Opening Day, winning both games. Reliever Syl Johnson started game one, but did not factor in the decision, as the game went to 11 innings. Starter Bucky Walters won game two.

See also
List of Philadelphia Phillies seasons
List of Philadelphia Phillies managers

References

External links
Philadelphia Phillies official website

Lists of Major League Baseball Opening Day starting pitchers
Opening